Frederick Kiwitt is a German professional boxer who held the WBO European welterweight title in 2019.

Early years and family 
Kiwitt was born in Saclepea, Liberia, in 1990 to a German father and Liberian mother during the Liberian Civil War. A few months after Kiwitt's birth, in order to escape the war, the family moved to the German city of Flensburg, where Kiwitt spent his childhood and youth.

Career 
Kiwitt joined the boxing division of local sports club DGF Flensborg in his hometown of Flensburg, Germany, at age 18. He trained there until moving to England to launch his professional career. He made his professional debut on 23 November 2013, beating his opponent on points. In 2018 he hired former professional boxer Manuel Ossie as his trainer.

Southern Area Champion

On 9 July 2017, Kiwitt had his first regional title fight. In London York Hall, he knocked out former English Champion Erick Ochieng in the seventh round to win the Southern Area Welterweight Title.

European Champion

On 22 February 2019, Kiwitt beat British boxer Paddy Gallagher at York Hall in London to win the WBO European Championship. He scored two knockdowns during the fight and was declared the winner on points after 10 rounds. Subsequently, the WBO ranked him at 11 in the welterweight division.

African Champion

Kiwitt became the African welterweight champion on 20 July 2019 in Accra, Ghana, scoring a technical knockout against Samuel Turkson in the fourth round.

German Champion

On 3 December 2022, Kiwitt fought for the first time in his hometown of Flensburg, defeating Ali Hasso for the German Superwelterweight Championship via a third-round knockout

Professional boxing record

References

External links 

Year of birth missing (living people)
Living people
Liberian male boxers
Welterweight boxers
German male boxers
African Boxing Union champions
People from Nimba County
Liberian people of German descent
Liberian emigrants to Germany
German expatriate sportspeople in the United Kingdom
People from Flensburg
Liberian expatriate sportspeople in the United Kingdom
Sportspeople from Schleswig-Holstein